Petrovsko is a village and municipality in  Krapina-Zagorje County in Croatia. According to the 2011 census, there were 2,656 inhabitants in the area, with Croats being the majority.

References

Populated places in Krapina-Zagorje County
Municipalities of Croatia